Clinidium balli is a species of ground beetle in the subfamily Rhysodinae. It was described by R.T. & J.R. Bell in 1985. It is named after George Ball, a friend of the describers of this species. It is known from the Hidalgo state, Mexico. Specimens in the type series measure  in length.

References

Clinidium
Beetles described in 1985
Beetles of North America
Endemic insects of Mexico